Wilson Kitara  is an Anglican bishop in Uganda: he has been  Bishop of Kitgum since 2018.

Kitara was born on 5 January 1971, educated at Uganda Christian University and ordained in 2001. He has served the Diocese of Kitgum as a parish priest, school chaplain, teacher and Diocesan Secretary.

References

Anglican bishops of Kitgum
21st-century Anglican bishops in Uganda
1971 births
Uganda Christian University alumni
Ugandan educators
Living people